Call Me by Fire (Season 2) (Chinese: 披荊斬棘; pinyin: Pī jīng zhǎn jí) is a 2022 Chinese singing reality television show 
which premiered on August 19, 2022, on Mango TV. The second season of Call Me by Fire, it features 32 seasoned male celebrities from mainland China, Taiwan, Hong Kong, Singapore, Thailand and the US who compete to form a boy band. The Chinese title of the show has also been renamed from 披荆斩棘的哥哥 to 披荊斬棘.

Contestants 
Each contestant's English name will be used if known. Otherwise, the hanyu pinyin version of the name would be used in the order of surname followed by given name. All Chinese names are in simplified Chinese.

References 

Singing talent shows
Chinese music television series
Mandopop
2022 Chinese television series debuts
Chinese television shows
Mandarin-language television shows
2022 in Chinese music
Hunan Broadcasting System original programming
Mango TV original programming